Mexico shares international borders with three nations:

To the north the United States–Mexico border, which extends for a length of  through the states of Baja California, Sonora, Chihuahua, Coahuila, Nuevo León and Tamaulipas.
Also to the southeast, the Guatemala–Mexico border, which measures  and touches the states of Campeche, Tabasco and Chiapas, and includes stretches of the Río Usumacinta, Río Salinas and Río Suchiate.

See also
 Garitas in Mexico

References

Borders
 
Geography of Mexico